Ramón Álvarez may refer to:

Ramón Álvarez (boxer) (born 1986), Mexican boxer
Ramón Álvarez (wrestler), Dominican wrestler
Ramón Álvarez Valdés (1866–1936), Spanish politician and lawyer
Ramón Álvarez Palomo, Asturian anarcho-syndicalist

See also
Ramón Álvarez de Mon, Spanish sports broadcaster